"Emotions" is the first single released from Twista's third album, Adrenaline Rush. After several unsuccessful singles from his previous albums, "Emotions" was Twista's first charting single, making it to both the R&B and Rap charts, while just narrowly missing the Billboard Hot 100, instead peaking at #1 Bubbling Under Hot 100 Singles (#101 on the US charts).

Charts

1997 singles
Twista songs
Songs written by Twista
1997 songs
Atlantic Records singles